Pingshan is a town located in the southeast of Dianjiang County of Chongqing Municipality. As of 2015, it has 3 communities and 13 villages under its administration.

History 
The town's set-up time is no clear date, because it have Heyouping ancient castle ruins, Although the castle has been planned as a tourist attraction. 
But it is certain that in July 2000 the town was renamed Pingshan Town.

Culture 
The town culture belong to Bayu culture,,the same as Chongqing City culture
, see Chongqing→Culture in Wikipedia.

Community

Village

Economic 
Pingshan Town from January to September 2015, industrial output value of 710 million yuan, an increase of 21.4%; total output value of industrial enterprises above designated size was 66.34 million yuan, an increase of 17.8%. Fixed assets investment 346 million yuan, an increase of 77.6%. Actual capital investment 430 million yuan, an increase of 72.3%, actual domestic capital 317 million yuan, an increase of 229%.

References

External links 
  Chongqing Municipality
 Dianjiang Country
 Chongqing Municipality Pingshan Town

Township-level divisions of Chongqing